Bandpey-e Gharbi District (meaning "Western Bandpey District") is a district (bakhsh) in Babol County, Mazandaran Province, Iran. At the 2006 census, its population was 25,577, in 6,886 families.  The District has one city: Khush Rudpey.  The District has two rural districts (dehestan): Khvosh Rud Rural District and Shahidabad Rural District.

References 

Babol County
Districts of Mazandaran Province